Rugrats Go Wild is a 2003 American crossover adventure film based on the Nickelodeon animated television series Rugrats and The Wild Thornberrys. It is the third and final installment in the Rugrats film series and the second film in The Wild Thornberrys series. It takes place after the ninth season of Rugrats and the fifth season of The Wild Thornberrys. Christine Cavanaugh, the original voice of Chuckie Finster, was replaced by Nancy Cartwright. 

The film was produced by Nickelodeon Movies and Klasky Csupo and released in theaters on June 13, 2003, by Paramount Pictures. Rugrats Go Wild was the least successful film in the Rugrats series, grossing $55.4 million worldwide and received negative reviews from critics. The film serves as the series finale for both Rugrats and The Wild Thornberrys.

The film used "Odorama", which allowed people to smell odors and aromas from the film using scratch and sniff cards (reminiscent of 1960s Smell-O-Vision).

Plot
The Rugrats go on an imaginary safari with Tommy impersonating Nigel Thornberry, who is his role model and spoofs his nature show; the babies and their families are about to go on vacation on the Lipschitz cruise ship. When the families arrive at the dock, they miss the Lipschitz cruise. Tommy's father, Stu, has rented a ramshackle boat called the S.S. Nancy which he reveals to be their real mode of transportation, and their real vacation. The families are angered that Stu did not consult them on his plans, and soon the boat is flipped over by a rogue wave during a tropical storm. Everyone is forced to abandon the ship and board a life raft as the ship sinks. Everyone blames Stu for causing all of this and lose hope of being saved.

The next morning, they arrive on a small, seemingly uninhabited island. The adults make Betty the leader after Didi forbids Stu from volunteering, much to his chagrin. On the opposite side of the island is the famous globe-trotting family, the Thornberrys out to film a clouded leopard. Tommy, Chuckie, and the rest of the kids, except for Angelica, set off to find Nigel, for they suspect he is somewhere on the island. Along the way, Chuckie gets lost and runs into the Thornberry's child Donnie, who steals Chuckie's clothes, forcing Chuckie to wear Donnie's shorts.

Meanwhile, Eliza Thornberry is exploring about the jungle with Darwin, her chimpanzee companion, and runs into Spike, the Pickles' dog. Since Eliza can talk to animals, Spike is heard speaking; he informs her that his babies are lost somewhere on the island. Under the impression that Spike means he is looking for puppies, Eliza and a reluctant Darwin agree to help him find them. Following a close encounter with Siri, an angry clouded leopard whom Spike believes to be just a regular domestic cat, they learn that he meant human babies.

Simultaneously, Eliza's father, Nigel, finds the lost babies. He heads in their direction but ends up tumbling down a hill and suffers amnesia after a coconut falls on his head, which reverts him to his three year-old self. They encounter Siri, but Donnie fends her off; Chuckie finds him and they get back their clothes. After escaping from Siri on a high-speed pram, the gang lands in a crater. Angelica runs into Debbie Thornberry, and takes off with Debbie in the Thornberry's all-purpose mobile communication vehicle commvee. In order to get back faster, Angelica steals the Thornberry's bathysphere, accidentally sinking the commvee in her attempt to pilot it, but manages to find and retrieve the babies and Nigel.

Meanwhile, Stu, who has managed to create a working coconut radio, and the other parents run into Donnie. After chasing him down the beach, they run into Marianne Thornberry, the mother of Eliza and Debbie and the wife of Nigel. Stu's coconut radio picks up the babies, Angelica having accidentally turned on the bathysphere's radio. Angelica and Susie, while fighting for control, have crashed the bathysphere at the bottom of the ocean. Nigel hits his head in the crash and reverts back to his normal self. Stu comes up with a successful plan to raise the commvee, and Marianne then uses the automatic-retrieval system to rescue Nigel and the babies just as the air runs out. 

The babies and Nigel are reunited with their respective families, with Stu being thanked and forgiven, and everyone finally gets on board the Lipschitz cruise. The Thornberrys join them, too, deciding that they should take a vacation, much to Debbie's delight, and Spike vows never to lose his babies again.

Voice cast

Main characters from Rugrats
 Tommy Pickles: E. G. Daily
 Chuckie Finster: Nancy Cartwright
 Phil DeVille and Lil DeVille: Kath Soucie
 Kimi Finster: Dionne Quan
 Angelica Pickles: Cheryl Chase 
 Dil Pickles: Tara Strong
 Susie Carmichael: Cree Summer
 Spike: Bruce Willis

Supporting and guest characters from Rugrats
 Stu Pickles: Jack Riley
 Didi Pickles: Melanie Chartoff
 Drew Pickles: Michael Bell
 Charlotte Pickles: Tress MacNeille
 Chas Finster: Michael Bell
 Kira Finster: Julia Kato
 Betty DeVille: Kath Soucie
 Howard DeVille: Philip Proctor
 Grandpa Lou Pickles: Joe Alaskey
 Dr. Bill Lipschitz: Tony Jay (This was Jay's final film appearance before his death in August 2006.)

Characters from The Wild Thornberrys
 Eliza Thornberry: Lacey Chabert
 Darwin Thornberry: Tom Kane
 Debbie Thornberry: Danielle Harris
 Donnie Thornberry: Flea
 Nigel Thornberry: Tim Curry
 Marianne Thornberry: Jodi Carlisle

One-shot characters
 Siri the clouded leopard: Chrissie Hynde (The Wild Thornberrys)
 Toa the monkey: Ethan Phillips

Production
Rugrats Go Wild was originally made by Klasky Csupo's television unit (directed by Mark Risley and written by Kate Boutilier), but after screenings, Paramount decided it should be shelved and remade into a feature film.

Among the biggest promotion the film received was Bruce Willis voicing Spike, and the use of "Odorama" cards to enhance the viewing experience, Burger King and Blockbuster released a scratch and sniff piece of cardboard that was to be scratched and sniffed during the run of the movie.

There were some complaints with the Odorama cards, including the claim that the cards only smelled like cardboard. The Odorama card was considered an homage to John Waters' 1981 film Polyester. Waters felt he was ripped off and realized that New Line Cinema, the studio that released Polyester, did not renew the copyright for Odorama. He later said that "a cheque would have been an homage".

The cards would later be released with the DVD release of the movie. Early trailers for the film give the title The Rugrats Meet The Wild Thornberrys.

Release
During its initial theatrical run, Rugrats Go Wild was presented in "Smell-O-Vision". During certain scenes in the movie, an icon would pop up on screen with an item inside of it (example: a smelly shoe). When this happened, audience members would smell a scratch-and-sniff card (which were handed out at the box office) with the corresponding image.

Marketing

Rating
Rugrats Go Wild is the only Rugrats film to receive a PG rating by the MPAA.

Home media
Paramount Home Entertainment released Rugrats Go Wild on VHS and DVD on December 16, 2003. Most VHS copies included a "Smell-O-Vision" scratch-and-sniff card, as did most initial run DVDs. Later copies of the DVD did not include additional cards, but did retain the option to view the film with the scratch-and-sniff icons on. The film is also available as a part of the Rugrats 3-disc set of all three films, as well as a double feature 2-disc set that also included The Rugrats Movie. The film was re-released on DVD on August 29, 2017. The film was released on Blu-ray through a trilogy movie collection set on March 8, 2022.

Reception

Box office
The film grossed $39.4 million domestically and $55.4 million worldwide against a production budget of $25 million. The film earned less than each of the other two Rugrats films. The film opened at #4 with Finding Nemo at the #1 spot.

Critical response

On review aggregation website Rotten Tomatoes the film holds an approval rating of 39% based on  reviews and an average rating of 5.02. The site's critics consensus reads: "The Rugrats franchise has gone from fresh to formulaic." Metacritic gives the film a weighted average score of 38 out of 100 based on 27 critics, indicating "generally unfavorable reviews". Audiences polled by CinemaScore gave the film an average grade of "A−" on an A+ to F scale.

Neil Smith at the BBC gave the film 2 out of 5. Film4 stated the film was not as bad as other reviews suggested but "it just doesn't hold a candle to 2002's charming and superior The Wild Thornberrys Movie".

Soundtrack

An original soundtrack was released on June 10, 2003, from Columbia Records.

The following is a list of songs that appear on the Rugrats Go Wild soundtrack.

See also

References

External links

 
 
 

2003 films
2003 animated films
2003 directorial debut films
2000s American animated films
2000s children's animated films
2000s English-language films
American children's animated adventure films
American children's animated musical films
American sequel films
Animated films about animals
Animated films based on animated series
American crossover films
Animated crossover films
Films about animals
Films about babies
Films about missing people
Films about vacationing
Films scored by Mark Mothersbaugh
Films set in Asia
Films set on islands
Films with scents
Klasky Csupo animated films
Nickelodeon animated films
Nickelodeon Movies films
Paramount Pictures animated films
Paramount Pictures films
Rugrats (franchise)
Rugrats (film series)
The Wild Thornberrys films
Films directed by Norton Virgien
American television series finales